Mill Creek Township is a township in Morgan County, in the U.S. state of Missouri.

Mill Creek Township was erected in 1833.

References

Townships in Missouri
Townships in Morgan County, Missouri